UTC+01:00 is an identifier for a time offset from UTC of +01:00. In ISO 8601, the associated time would be written as 2019-02-07T23:28:34+01:00. This time is used in:
Central European Time
West Africa Time
Western European Summer Time
British Summer Time
Irish Standard Time

Central European Time (Northern Hemisphere winter)

Principal cities: Berlin, Frankfurt, Munich, Rome, Milan, Paris, Madrid, Barcelona, Warsaw, Prague, Zagreb, Budapest, Brussels, Amsterdam, Vienna, Luxembourg City, Copenhagen, Stockholm, Oslo, Bern, Zurich,  Tirana, Sarajevo, Pristina, Valletta, Monte Carlo, Podgorica, Skopje, San Marino, Dogana, Belgrade, Bratislava, Ljubljana, Vatican City, Monaco, Monaco-Ville, Westside

Europe

Central Europe 
Albania
Andorra
Austria
Belgium
Bosnia and Herzegovina
Croatia
Czech Republic
Denmark
France (Metropolitan)
Germany
Hungary
Italy
Kosovo
Liechtenstein
Luxembourg
Malta
Monaco
Montenegro
Netherlands
North Macedonia
Norway 
Svalbard (including Bear Island)
Jan Mayen
Poland
San Marino
Serbia
Slovakia
Slovenia
Spain (Including Balearic Islands, Ceuta, Catalonia and Melilla and excluding Canary Islands) 
Andalusia
Asturias
Basque Country
Cantabria
Castilla-La Mancha
Castile and León
Extremadura
Galicia
La Rioja
Madrid
Murcia
Navarre
Valencian Community
Sweden
Gotland
Switzerland
United Kingdom
Gibraltar
Vatican City

Antarctica 
Norway
Bouvet Island
Queen Maud Land

Western European Summer Time (Northern Hemisphere summer)
 
Principal cities: London, Glasgow, Belfast, Cardiff, Dublin, Lisbon, Porto

Europe

Western Europe 
Denmark
Faroe Islands
Ireland
Portugal (Including Madeira and excluding Azores islands)
United Kingdom (Great Britain) – (GMT / BST) (Including Guernsey, Isle of Man and Jersey)
England
Scotland
Northern Isles
Orkney
Shetland
Western Isles
Northern Ireland
Wales
Anglesey
Channel Islands (Crown Dependencies)
Alderney
Sark
Herm
Isle of Wight
Normandy
Some small islands Channel Islands or Crown Dependencies
Brecqhou
Jethou
Lihou
Écréhous
Minquiers
Les Dirouilles
Pierres de Lecq
Casquets
Renonquet
Caquorobert
Crevichon
Grande Amfroque
Les Houmets

Atlantic Ocean 
Portugal
Madeira
Spain
Canary Islands GMT±0

As standard time (year-round)
Principal cities: Lagos, Kinshasa, Algiers, Tunis, Rabat, Casablanca, Yaoundé, Douala, Malabo, Libreville, Niamey, N'Djamena, Bangui, Porto-Novo, Cotonou, Luanda, Laayoune

Africa

West Africa 
Algeria
Angola
Benin
Cameroon
Central African Republic
Chad
Republic of the Congo
Democratic Republic of the Congo:
The provinces of Bandundu, Équateur, Kinshasa, Kongo Central, Kwango, Kwilu, Mai-Ndombe, Mongala, Nord-Ubangi, Sud-Ubangi and Tshuapa
Equatorial Guinea
Gabon
Morocco
Niger
Nigeria
Tunisia
Western Sahara

Discrepancies between official UTC+01:00 and geographical UTC+01:00

Areas in UTC+01:00 longitudes using UTC+02:00 
From south to north:

 South Africa
 The westernmost part, including Cape Town
 Botswana
 The western part of the districts:
 Kgalagadi
 Ghanzi
 Ngamiland
 Demoratic Republic of the Congo
 The very westernmost part of Lualaba Province, Kasaï-Central and Sankuru
 Libya
 The most part in the country, including nation's capital Tripoli
 Greece (standard time)
 The western part, including Patras and Ioanina
 Romania (standard time)
 The westernmost part, including Timișoara
 Russia
 Kaliningrad Oblast
 Lithuania (standard time)
 The westernmost part, including Klaipėda
 Latvia (standard time)
 The westernmost part, including Liepāja
 Estonia (standard time)
 The westernmost parts of the Saare and Hiiu counties
 Finland (standard time)
 The westernmost part, including Turku

Areas outside UTC+01:00 longitudes using UTC+01:00 time

Areas between meridians 7°30'W and 7°30'E ("physical" UTC+00:00) 
All of:

 Andorra
 Belgium
Gibraltar
 Luxembourg
 Monaco
 Netherlands
 Benin

Most of:

 Spain, excluding Canary Islands (which use UTC) and westernmost part of the mainland (see below)
France (with excepction of small parts of Alsace, Lorraine and Provence are east of 7°30'E)
Algeria, including Algiers

Parts of:

 Equatorial Guinea (Annobón Island only)
 Morocco (northeastern part)
Niger (western part)
Nigeria (western part)
Germany (The very westernmost part)
Switzerland (westernmost part)
Italy (The very northwesternmost part)
Norway (Bouvet Island and southwesternmost part)

Areas between meridians 22°30'W and 7°30'W ("physical" UTC−01:00) 
Spain

 Parts of Galicia, Extremadura and Andalucia
Norway

 Jan Mayen

Morocco

 Southwestern part, including Casablanca

Western Sahara 

 Most part in the territory (occupied by Morocco, excluding claimed by Sahrawi Arab Democratic Republic which use UTC+00:00)

References

External links
 

UTC offsets